Boys Don't Cry is The Cure's first compilation album. Released in February 1980, this album is composed of several tracks from the band's May 1979 debut album Three Imaginary Boys (which had yet to see a U.S. release) with material from the band's 1978–1979 era.

Release 
Boys Don't Cry was released on 5 February 1980 by record label Fiction. According to AllMusic, the album "[falls] somewhere between [an] official release and compilation", and was released "in hopes of increasing the band's exposure outside of the U.K."

A new version of the title track was released in April 1986.

Reception 

Boys Don't Cry has been generally well received by critics. Debra Rae Cohen of Rolling Stone wrote that the album "proves they can transcend their Comp. Lit. 201 (Elementary Angst) scenarios." Robert Christgau of The Village Voice called the band's sound "dry post-punk, never pretty but treated with a properly mnemonic pop overlay", and was more reserved in his praise, adding, "I can look over the titles and recall a phrase from all but a few of these 13 songs. Intelligent phrases they are, too, yet somehow I find it hard to get really excited about them."

In 2000, Boys Don't Cry was voted number 775 in Colin Larkin's All Time Top 1000 Albums. In 2003, the album was ranked at number 442 on Rolling Stones list of the 500 greatest albums of all time. In a 2012 update of the list, it moved up to number 438.

Track listing 

 On most CD versions of the album, "Object" was replaced by "So What", the scream at the end of "Subway Song" was shortened and "World War" was removed.

Personnel 
The Cure

 Robert Smith – guitar, vocals, harmonica
 Michael Dempsey – bass guitar
 Lol Tolhurst – drums

Technical

Chris Parry – production

Certifications and sales

References

External links 

 

The Cure compilation albums
1980 compilation albums
Fiction Records compilation albums
Elektra Records compilation albums